Boonen is a surname. Notable people with the surname include:

 Arnold Boonen (1669–1729), Dutch painter
 Jacobus Boonen (1573–1655), Belgian bishop
 Jan Boonen (born 1940), Belgian racing cyclist
 Jorge Boonen (1858–1921), Chilean military officer
 Indy Boonen (born 1999), Belgian footballer
 Tom Boonen (born 1980), Belgian road bicycle racer